Albion Vrenezi (born 4 October 1993) is a Kosovan professional footballer who plays as a left winger for 1860 Munich.

Career
In summer 2017, Vrenezi transferred from FC Augsburg II to SSV Jahn Regensburg. He made his professional debut on 20 August 2017 in a 4–2 win of Jahn Regensburg against FC Ingolstadt 04.

References

External links
 
 

1993 births
Living people
Kosovan footballers
Kosovan expatriate footballers
Kosovan expatriate sportspeople in Germany
Expatriate footballers in Germany
Association football wingers
FC Augsburg II players
SSV Jahn Regensburg players
Würzburger Kickers players
Türkgücü München players
TSV 1860 Munich players
Regionalliga players
2. Bundesliga players
3. Liga players